Much of the state of Florida is situated on a peninsula between the Gulf of Mexico, the Atlantic Ocean, and the Straits of Florida. Spanning two time zones, it extends to the northwest into a panhandle along the northern Gulf of Mexico. It is bordered on the north by the states of Georgia and Alabama, on the west, at the end of the panhandle, by Alabama. It is near The Bahamas, and several Caribbean countries, particularly Cuba. Florida has 131 public airports, and more than 700 private airports, airstrips, heliports, and seaplane bases. Florida is one of the largest states east of the Mississippi River, and only Alaska and Michigan are larger in water area.

History 

Florida's extensive coastline made it a perceived target during World War II, so the government built airstrips throughout the state; today, approximately 400 airports are still in service.

Physiogeographic provinces
Florida has three distinct physiographic provinces: Gulf Coastal Lowlands, Atlantic Coastal Lowlands, and Interior Highlands.

Terrain 

At 345 feet (105 m) above mean sea level, Britton Hill in northern Walton County is the highest point in Florida and the lowest known highpoint of any U.S. state. The most prominent topographic feature on the Florida Peninsula is the Lake Wales Ridge, a narrow sand ridge that runs north to south down the center of peninsular Florida. The highest point on the Ridge and in peninsular Florida, Sugarloaf Mountain, is a  peak in Lake County. Miami and other parts of south Florida are the most vulnerable regions in the world to rising sea levels associated with climate change. Due to the vast amounts of limestone bedrock that Florida sits above, water is allowed to move relatively freely beneath dry land and to rise up to the surface. Water will also likely encroach from the Atlantic Coast and the Gulf Coast, and up through the Everglades, endangering the plant biomass within its marsh communities .

Boundaries 
The state line begins in the Atlantic Ocean, traveling west, south, and north up the thalweg of the Saint Mary's River. At the origin of that river, it then follows a straight line nearly due west and slightly north, to the point where the confluence of the Flint River (from Georgia) and the Chattahoochee River (down the Alabama/Georgia line) used to form Florida's Apalachicola River. (Since Woodruff Dam was built, this point has been under Lake Seminole.) The border with Georgia continues north through the lake for a short distance up the former thalweg of the Chattahoochee, then with Alabama runs due west along 31°N to the Perdido River, then south along its thalweg to the Gulf via Perdido Bay. Much of the state is at or near sea level. Florida is also 65,755 square miles.

Climate 

The climate of Florida is tempered by the fact that no part of the state is very distant from the ocean. North of Lake Okeechobee, the prevalent climate is humid subtropical, while coastal areas south of the lake (including the Florida Keys) have a true tropical climate. Mean high temperatures for late July are primarily in the low 90s Fahrenheit (32–34 °C). Mean low temperatures for early to mid January range from the low 40s Fahrenheit (4–7 °C) in northern Florida to the mid-50s (≈13 °C) in southern Florida.In the summer, high temperatures in the state seldom exceed 100 °F (38 °C). During the late autumn and winter months, Florida has experienced occasional cold fronts that can bring high winds and relatively cooler temperatures for the entire state, with high temperatures that could remain into the 40s and 50s (4 to 15 °C) and lows in the 20s and 30s (−7 to 4 °C). Several record cold maxima have been in the 30s °F (−1 to 4 °C) and record lows have been in the 10s (−12 to −7 °C). These temperatures normally extend at most a few days at a time in the northern and central parts of Florida. Southern Florida, however, rarely encounters sub-freezing temperatures.

The USDA Plant hardiness zones for the state range from zone 8a (no colder than  ) in the Crestview to zone 10b (no colder than  ) in Southeast Florida in 1990. Miami Beach and the keys are Zone 11.The seasons in Florida are determined more by precipitation than by temperature, with the hot, wet springs and summers making up the wet season, and mild to cool, and the relatively dry winters and autumns, making the dry season. Fall foliage appears in Central and North Florida starting around late November, and into winter. During El Niño there is greater rainfall between November to March.
At the end of El Niño in 1998, 480 wildfires occurred.

The Florida Keys, because they are completely surrounded by water, have lesser variability in temperatures. At Key West, temperatures rarely exceed  in the summer or fall below  in the winter, and frost has never been reported in the Keys.

Severe weather 

Florida's nickname is the "Sunshine State", but severe weather is a common occurrence in the state. Central Florida is known as the lightning capital of the United States, as it experiences more lightning strikes than anywhere else in the country.
 Florida has the highest average precipitation of any state, in large part because afternoon thunderstorms are common in most of the state from late spring until early autumn. A fair day may be interrupted with a storm, only to return to sunshine an hour or so later. These thunderstorms, caused by overland collisions of moist masses of air from the Gulf of Mexico and Atlantic Ocean, pop up in the early afternoon and can bring heavy downpours, high winds, and sometimes, tornadoes. Florida leads the United States in tornadoes per square mile (when including waterspouts), but they do not typically reach the intensity of those in the Midwest and Great Plains. Hail often accompanies the most severe thunderstorms.

A narrow eastern part of the state including Orlando and Jacksonville receives between 2,400 and 2,800 hours of sunshine annually. The rest of the state, including Miami, receives between 2,800 and 3,200 hours annually.

Snow in Florida is a rare occurrence, especially on the peninsula. During the Great Blizzard of 1899, Florida experienced blizzard conditions; the Tampa Bay area had "gulf-effect" snow, similar to lake-effect snow in the Great Lakes region. During the 1899 blizzard was the only time the temperature in Florida is known to have fallen below 0 degrees Fahrenheit (−18 °C). The most widespread snowfall in Florida history occurred on January 19, 1977, when snow fell over much of the state, with flurries as far south as Homestead. Snow flurries also fell on Miami Beach for the only time in recorded history. A hard freeze in 2003 brought "ocean-effect" snow flurries to the Atlantic coast as far south as Cape Canaveral.
The 1993 Superstorm brought blizzard conditions to the panhandle, while heavy rain and tornadoes beset the peninsula. The storm is believed to have been similar in composition to a hurricane, some Gulf coast regions even seeing storm surges of six feet or more. More recently, traces of snow and sleet fell across central Florida during a hard freeze event in January, 2010. There was some slight accumulation north of the I-4 corridor, mostly in the form of sleet.

Hurricanes 

Hurricanes pose a severe threat during hurricane season, which lasts from June 1 to November 30, although some storms have been known to form out of season. Florida is the most hurricane-prone US state, with subtropical or tropical water on a lengthy coastline. From 1851 to 2006, Florida has been struck by 114 hurricanes, 37 of them major—category 3 and above. It is rare for a hurricane season to pass without any impact in the state by at least a tropical storm. For storms, category 4 or higher, 83% have either hit Florida or Texas. August to October is the most likely period for a hurricane in Florida.

In 2004, Florida was hit by a record four hurricanes. Hurricanes Charley (August 13), Frances (September 4–5), Ivan (September 16), and Jeanne (September 25–26) cumulatively cost the state's economy $42 billion. In 2005, Hurricane Dennis (July 10) became the fifth storm to strike Florida within eleven months. Later, Hurricane Katrina (August 25) passed through South Florida and Hurricane Rita (September 20) swept through the Florida Keys. Hurricane Wilma (October 24) made landfall near Cape Romano, just south of Marco Island, finishing another very active hurricane season. Wilma is the second most expensive hurricane in Florida history, due in part to a five-year window in which to file claims.

Florida was the site of the second costliest weather disaster in U.S. history, Hurricane Andrew, which caused more than US$25 billion in damage when it struck on August 24, 1992. In a long list of other infamous hurricane strikes are the 1926 Miami hurricane, the 1928 Okeechobee hurricane, the Labor Day Hurricane of 1935, Hurricane Donna in 1960, Hurricane Opal in 1995, and Hurricane Michael in 2018. A 2005 US government report suggests the storms are part of a natural cycle and not a result of global warming, but that report has been criticized as having been politicized.

Animals of Florida 

Florida is host to many types of wildlife including:
 Marine mammals: bottlenose dolphin, short-finned pilot whale, North Atlantic right whale, West Indian manatee
 Reptiles: American alligator and crocodile, eastern diamondback and pygmy rattlesnakes, gopher tortoise, green and leatherback sea turtles, eastern indigo snake
 Mammals: Florida panther, northern river otter, mink, eastern cottontail rabbit, marsh rabbit, raccoon, striped skunk, squirrel, white-tailed deer, Key deer, bobcats, gray fox, coyote, wild boar, Florida black bear, nine-banded armadillos
 Birds: bald eagle, crested caracara, snail kite, osprey, white and brown pelicans, sea gulls, whooping and sandhill cranes, roseate spoonbill, Florida scrub jay (state endemic), and others. One subspecies of wild turkey, Meleagris gallopavo, namely subspecies osceola, is found only in the state of Florida. The state is a wintering location for many species of eastern North American birds.
Invertebrates: carpenter ants, termites, and American cockroach.

The only known calving area for the northern right whale is off the coasts of Florida and Georgia.

Since their accidental importation from South America into North America in the 1930s, the red imported fire ant population has increased its territorial range to include most of the Southern United States, including Florida. They are more aggressive than most native ant species and have a painful sting.

A number of non-native snakes have been released in the wild. In 2010 the state created a hunting season for Burmese and Indian pythons, African rock pythons, green anacondas, and Nile monitor lizards.

Geology 

The Florida peninsula is a porous plateau of karst limestone sitting atop bedrock known as the Florida Platform. The emergent portion of the platform was created during the Eocene to Oligocene as the Gulf Trough filled with silts, clays, and sands. Flora and fauna began appearing during the Miocene. No land animals were present in Florida prior to the Miocene.

The largest deposits of phosphate rock in the country are found in Florida.

Extended systems of underwater caves, sinkholes and springs are found throughout the state and supply most of the water used by residents. The limestone is topped with sandy soils deposited as ancient beaches over millions of years as global sea levels rose and fell. During the last glacial period, lower sea levels and a drier climate revealed a much wider peninsula, largely savanna. The Everglades, a wide, slow-flowing river, encompasses the southern tip of the peninsula.

While there are sinkholes in much of the state, modern sinkholes have tended to be in West-Central Florida.

Florida is tied for last place (with North Dakota) as having the fewest earthquakes of any US state. Because Florida is not located near any tectonic plate boundaries, earthquakes are very rare, but not totally unknown. In January 1880, Cuba was the center of two strong earthquakes that sent severe shock waves through the city of Key West, Florida. (See List of earthquakes in Cuba) Another earthquake centered outside Florida was the 1886 Charleston earthquake. The shock was felt throughout northern Florida, ringing church bells at St. Augustine and severely jolting other towns along that section of Florida's east coast. Jacksonville residents felt many of the strong aftershocks that occurred in September, October, and November 1886. The earthquake was too small to trigger a tsunami and no damage was reported.

See also 
List of counties in Florida
List of Florida state parks
List of bays of Florida

References